Marianna Wiśniowiecka (1600 – February 1624) was Ruthenian noblewoman (szlachcianka) in Kingdom of Poland, the oldest daughter of Prince Konstanty Wiśniowiecki and Anna Zahorowska of Ostoja Clan.

In February 1620 she married Polish magnate Jakub Sobieski, the father of King of Poland Jan III Sobieski. She probably died in childbirth.

Children
Marianna and Jakub had two daughters:
Teresa (b. 1622 d. 1623)
unknown daughter (b. and d. February 1624)

Bibliography
 Lepecki M., Pan Jakobus Sobieski, Spółdzielnia Wydawnicza Czytelnik, Warszawa 1970, s. 93–103, 158.
 Podhorodecki L., Sobiescy herbu Janina, Ludowa Spółdzielnia Wydawnicza, Warszawa 1981, s. 30, 41.
 Czamańska I., Wiśniowieccy. Monografia rodu, Wydawnictwo Poznańskie, Poznań 2007, s. 156–157.

1600 births
1624 deaths
Marianna
Deaths in childbirth